Mesiphiastus pallidus is a species of beetle in the family Cerambycidae. It was described by Per Olof Christopher Aurivillius in 1917, originally under the genus Platyomopsis.

References

Pteropliini
Beetles described in 1917
Taxa named by Per Olof Christopher Aurivillius